Woody Point may refer to:

 Woody Point, Newfoundland and Labrador, Canada
 Woody Point, Queensland, Australia
 Woody Point, Isle of Wight, United Kingdom